The Dark Side of the Moon is a 1973 album by Pink Floyd.

Dark Side of the Moon may also refer to:

The physical Moon 
Far side of the Moon, the portion of the Moon's surface that cannot be directly observed from Earth

Film and television
 The Dark Side of the Moon (1986 film), a Danish film
 The Dark Side of the Moon (1990 film), a film by D.J. Webster
 Dark Side of the Moon (2002 film), a 2002 French mockumentary about the Apollo 11 Moon landing
 The Dark Side of the Moon (TV series), a 2012–2018 Russian television series
 "Dark Side of the Moon" (Supergirl), a 2018 episode of Supergirl
 "Dark Side of the Moon" (Supernatural), a 2010 episode of Supernatural
 "Dark Side of the Moon", a 2000 episode of Frasier
 "Dark Side of the Moon", a 1998 episode of Silent Möbius

Literature
 The Dark Side of the Moon, a 1976 young adult novel by William Corlett
 Dark Side of the Moon, a 2006 novel by Sherrilyn Kenyon
 The Dark Side of the Moon, a 2000 novel by Martin Suter

Music

Artists 
 The Dark Side of the Moon, a German-Swiss band formed by Melissa Bonny

Other albums
 The Dark Side of the Moon (2009 album), an album by the Flaming Lips and Stardeath and White Dwarfs, recreating the Pink Floyd album.
 Dark Side of the Moon, a 1972 album by Medicine Head
 Dark Side of the Moon, the 2020 debut EP by South Korean singer and Mamamoo member Moonbyul

Songs
 "Dark Side of the Moon", a 1999 song by Dune
 "Dark Side of the Moon", a 2010 song by Vin Garbutt from Word of Mouth
 "Dark Side of the Moon", a 1972 song by Hawk from Africa She Too Can Cry 
 "Dark Side of the Moon", a 2018 song by Lil Wayne from Tha Carter V
 "The Dark Side of the Moon", a  brass band composition by Paul Lovatt-Cooper

Tours
 Dark Side of the Moon Tour, a 1972–1973 concert tour by Pink Floyd
 The Dark Side of the Moon Live, a 2006–2008 concert tour by former Pink Floyd member Roger Waters

Other uses
 Dark Side of the Moon: A Sci-Fi Adventure, a 1998 PC video game
 Darkside, a 2013 radio play by Tom Stoppard based on the Pink Floyd album

See also

 "Carolina in My Mind", a 1969 James Taylor song using the phrase
 The Dark Side of the Moo, a 1986 Pink Floyd bootleg album
 Dark Side of the Spoon, a 1999 album by the band Ministry
 A Hill on the Dark Side of the Moon, a 1983 Swedish film
 Dark of the Moon (disambiguation)
 Dark side (disambiguation)
 Lunar phase, the shape of the Moon's sunlit portion as viewed from Earth
 Planetshine, the illumination of an otherwise dark part of a moon by light reflected from its planet